Redeemer Lutheran School is a name for several Lutheran schools and may refer to:

In Australia

In the United States
 Redeemer Lutheran Church and School (Arizona) in Tucson, Arizona
 Christ Our Redeemer Lutheran School in Aurora, Colorado
 Redeemer Lutheran School (Florida) in Pensacola, Florida
 Redeemer Lutheran School (Indiana) in Kokomo, Indiana
 Redeemer Christian Academy in Wayzata, Minnesota
 Redeemer Lutheran School (New York) in Queens, New York
 Redeemer Lutheran School (Pennsylvania) in Verona, Pennsylvania
 Redeemer Lutheran School (Texas) in Austin, Texas
 Our Redeemer Lutheran School (Texas) in Dallas, Texas
 Redeemer Lutheran Church and School (Utah) in Salt Lake City, Utah
 Our Redeemer Lutheran School (Delavan, Wisconsin) in Delavan, Wisconsin
 Our Redeemer Lutheran School (Madison, Wisconsin) in Madison, Wisconsin